Deh Qaleh (also Romanized as Deh Qal’eh and Deh-e Qal‘eh) is a village in Irandegan Rural District, Irandegan District, Khash County, Sistan and Baluchestan Province, Iran. At the 2006 census, its population was 225, in 58 families.

References 

Populated places in Khash County